Aaldersville is a community in the Canadian province of Nova Scotia, located in the Chester Municipal District .

Communities in Lunenburg County, Nova Scotia